

Results

Women's junior cross-country
UCI